Dong Cheng (born August 14, 1986) is a Chinese female boxer who competes in the lightweight (60 kg) division.

At the 2012 Summer Olympics, she reached the quarterfinals by beating Mihaela Lacatus, before losing to Mavzuna Chorieva.

See also
China at the 2012 Summer Olympics - Boxing
Boxing at the 2012 Summer Olympics – Women's lightweight

References 

1986 births
Living people
Sportspeople from Hubei
People from Tianmen
Chinese women boxers
Boxers at the 2012 Summer Olympics
Olympic boxers of China
Asian Games medalists in boxing
Boxers at the 2010 Asian Games
Asian Games gold medalists for China
Medalists at the 2010 Asian Games
Lightweight boxers